Sweet is an unincorporated community in Gem County, Idaho, United States.

Founded in 1885 by Ezekiel Sweet, the community initially was a supply location and post office for farmers and ranchers in the nearby Lower Squaw Creek Valley.  Sweet grew significantly as a result of the later Thunder Mountain Mines gold strike; by 1900, it supported three saloons, three hotels, several businesses, and a newspaper, which lasted until the gold mines had petered out.  Several subsequent fires destroyed most of the historic downtown.  Today, a smaller Sweet is the location of a restaurant, Butcher Shop, repair shop, lumber mill and a post office.

The Upper Brownlee School in Sweet, and the Sweet Methodist Episcopal Church, are both listed on the National Register of Historic Places.

Shadow Butte, located northwest of Sweet, and is a notable landmark in the area.

References

Boise metropolitan area
Unincorporated communities in Gem County, Idaho
Unincorporated communities in Idaho